Guangxi Non-ferrous Metals Group Co., Ltd. was a state-owned enterprise of China, based in Nanning, Guangxi Zhuang Autonomous Region. It was managed by the State-owned Assets Supervision and Administration Commission (SASAC) of the Government of Guangxi.

The company was the first bankrupted interbank bond issuer, according to Hong Kong-based newspaper South China Morning Post and Caixin. This and other bankruptcies in the metals sector are widely considered the reason for the Chinese government's push toward reducing  production overcapacities in an effort to restructure the economy.

References

External links
  (offline)

Metal companies of China
Companies based in Guangxi
Chinese companies established in 2008
Companies owned by the provincial government of China
2008 establishments in China